Val-Mont is a commune in the Côte-d'Or department of eastern France. The municipality was established on 1 January 2016 and consists of the former communes of Jours-en-Vaux and Ivry-en-Montagne.

See also 
Communes of the Côte-d'Or department

References 

Communes of Côte-d'Or
States and territories established in 2016
Populated places established in 2016